The following is a list of past and present U.S. Routes in the U.S. state of Nevada. All active mainline and alternate routes are maintained by the Nevada Department of Transportation. Some active special routes are maintained by local municipalities, and may not be signed on the route itself.


Main routes

Special routes

See also

 List of Interstate Highways in Nevada
 List of state routes in Nevada
 List of Nevada Scenic Byways

References

External links

 Nevada Highways @ AARoads
 Nevada Department of Transportation

 
US